Dounby Click Mill is a mill located on the Mainland of Orkney, in Scotland. It is the last of the horizontal or "Norse" watermills of Orkney still in working order.

The mill is constructed with drystone walls and roofed with flagstones and turf. The design avoids the use of complicated gearing to transfer the drive to the millstones by mounting the stones directly above the wheel and on the same shaft.

It has been restored by, and is owned by, Historic Environment Scotland.

References

Historic Scotland properties in Orkney
Watermills in Scotland
Mainland, Orkney